Leptosiaphos is a genus of skinks endemic to West Africa.

Species
The following 18 species are recognized:

Leptosiaphos aloysiisabaudiae  - Uganda five-toed skink 
Leptosiaphos amieti  - Cameroon five-toed skink
Leptosiaphos blochmanni  - Zaire three-toed skink
Leptosiaphos dewittei  - De Witte's leaf-litter skink, De Witte's five-toed skink
Leptosiaphos dungeri 
Leptosiaphos fuhni  - Fuhn's five-toed skink
Leptosiaphos graueri  - Rwanda five-toed skink
Leptosiaphos hackarsi  - Hackars's five-toed skink 
Leptosiaphos hylophilus  - Laurenti's five-toed skink
Leptosiaphos ianthinoxantha  - yellow and violet-bellied mountain skink
Leptosiaphos kilimensis  - Kilimanjaro five-toed skink
Leptosiaphos koutoui 
Leptosiaphos luberoensis  - Witte's five-toed skink
Leptosiaphos meleagris  - Ruwenzori four-toed skink
Leptosiaphos pauliani 
Leptosiaphos rhodurus  - red five-toed skink 
Leptosiaphos rhomboidalis Broadley, 1989 - Udzungwa five-toed skink
Leptosiaphos vigintiserierum (Sjöstedt, 1897) - African five-toed skink

Nota bene: A binomial authority in parentheses indicates that the species was originally described in a genus other than Leptosiaphos.

References

Further reading
 Schmidt KP (1943). "Amphibians and Reptiles from the Sudan". Zool. Series Field Mus. Nat Hist. 24 (29): 331-338. (Leptosiaphos'', new genus, p. 332).

 
Lizard genera
Taxa named by Karl Patterson Schmidt